Ulmus rubra, the slippery elm, is a species of elm native to eastern North America.
Other common names include red elm, gray elm, soft elm, moose elm, and Indian elm.

Description
Its heartwood is reddish-brown. The leaves are often tinged red on emergence, turning dark green by summer and a dull yellow in autumn. The perfect, apetalous, wind-pollinated flowers are produced before the leaves in early spring, usually in tight, short-stalked, clusters of 10–20.

Similar species 
The species superficially resembles American elm (Ulmus americana), but is more closely related to the European wych elm (U. glabra), which has a very similar flower structure, though lacks the pubescence over the seed. U. rubra is chiefly distinguished from American elm by its downy twigs, chestnut brown or reddish hairy buds, and slimy red inner bark.

Taxonomy 
The tree was first named as part of Ulmus americana in 1753, but identified as a separate species, U. rubra, in 1793 by Pennsylvania botanist Gotthilf Muhlenberg. The slightly later name U. fulva, published by French botanist André Michaux in 1803, is still widely used in information related to dietary supplements and alternative medicine.

Etymology 
The specific epithet rubra (red) alludes to the tree's reddish wood, whilst the common name 'slippery elm' alludes to the mucilaginous inner bark.

The reddish-brown heartwood lends the tree the common name 'red elm'.

Distribution and habitat 
The species is native to eastern North America, ranging from southeast North Dakota, east to Maine and southern Quebec, south to northernmost Florida, and west to eastern Texas, where it thrives in moist uplands, although it will also grow in dry, intermediate soils.

Ecology

Pests and diseases 
The tree is reputedly less susceptible to Dutch elm disease than other species of American elms, but is severely damaged by the elm leaf beetle (Xanthogaleruca luteola).

Hybrids 
In the central United States, native U. rubra hybridizes in the wild with the Siberian elm (U. pumila), which was introduced in the early 20th century and has spread widely since, prompting conservation concerns for the genetic integrity of the former species.

Cultivation 
The species has seldom been planted for ornament in its native country. It occasionally appeared in early 20th-century US nursery catalogues. Introduced to Europe and Australasia, it has never thrived in the UK; Elwes & Henry knew of not one good specimen, and the last tree planted at Kew attained a height of only  in 60 years. Specimens supplied by the Späth nursery to the Royal Botanic Garden Edinburgh in 1902 as U. fulva may survive in Edinburgh as it was the practice of the Garden to distribute trees about the city (vide Wentworth Elm). A specimen at RBGE was felled c.1990. The current list of Living Accessions held in the Garden per se does not list the plant. Several mature trees survive in Brighton (see Accessions). The tree was propagated and marketed in the UK by the Hillier & Sons nursery, Winchester, Hampshire, from 1945, with 20 sold in the period 1970 to 1976, when production ceased.

U. rubra was introduced to Europe in 1830.

There are no known cultivars, though Meehan misnamed Ulmus americana 'Beebe's Weeping' as U. fulva pendula (1889) and Späth misnamed Ulmus americana 'Pendula' U. fulva (Michx.) pendula Hort. (1890). The hybrid U. rubra × U. pumila cultivar 'Lincoln' is sometimes erroneously listed as U. rubra 'Lincoln'.

Hybrid cultivars 
U. rubra had limited success as a hybrid parent in the 1960s, resulting in the cultivars 'Coolshade', 'Fremont', 'Improved Coolshade', 'Lincoln', 'Rosehill', and probably 'Willis'. In later years, it was also used in the Wisconsin elm breeding program to produce 'Repura' and 'Revera' although neither is known to have been released to commerce. In Germany, the tree formed part of a complex hybrid raised by the Eisele nursery in Darmstadt, provisionally named 'Eisele H1'; patent  pending (2020).

Uses

Food
The mucilaginous inner bark of the tree is edible raw or boiled, and was eaten by Native Americans. The bark can also be used to make tea.

Medicinal
The species has various traditional medicinal uses. The inner bark has long been used as a demulcent, and is still produced commercially for this purpose in the United States with approval for sale as an over-the-counter demulcent by the US Food and Drug Administration. Sometimes the leaves are dried and ground into a powder, then made into a tea.

Timber
The timber is not of much importance commercially, and is not found anywhere in great quantity. Macoun considered it more durable than that of the other elms, and better suited for railway ties, fence-posts, and rails, while Pinchot recommended planting it in the Mississippi valley, as it grows fast in youth, and could be utilized for fence-posts when quite young, since the sapwood, if thoroughly dried, is quite as durable as the heartwood. The wood is also used for the hubs of wagon wheels, as it is very shock resistant owing to the interlocking grain. The wood, as 'red elm', is sometimes used to make bows for archery. The yoke of the Liberty Bell, a symbol of the independence of the United States, was made from slippery elm.

Baseball
Though now outmoded, slippery elm tablets were chewed by spitball pitchers to enhance the effectiveness of the saliva applied to make the pitched baseball curve. Gaylord Perry wrote about how he used slippery elm tablets in his 1974 autobiography, Me and the Spitter.

Miscellaneous
The tree's fibrous inner bark produces a strong and durable fiber that can be spun into thread, twine, or rope useful for bowstrings, ropes, jewellery, clothing, snowshoe bindings, woven mats, and even some musical instruments. Once cured, the wood is also excellent for starting fires with the bow-drill method, as it grinds into a very fine flammable powder under friction.

Culture

Notable trees 
A tree in Westmount, Quebec, Canada, measured  in girth in 2011. In the UK, there is no designated Tree Register champion.

Accessions

North America 
 Arnold Arboretum, US. Acc. nos. 737–88 (unrecorded provenance), 172-2017 (Massachusetts), 344-2017 (Missouri).
 Bernheim Arboretum and Research Forest , Clermont, Kentucky, US. No details available.
 Brenton Arboretum, Dallas Center, Iowa, US. No details available.
 Chicago Botanic Garden, Glencoe, Illinois, US. 1 tree, no other details available.
 Dominion Arboretum, Ottawa, Ontario, Canada. No acc. details available.
 Longwood Gardens, US. Acc. no. L–3002, of unrecorded provenance.
 Nebraska Statewide Arboretum, US. No details available.
 Smith College, US. Acc. no. 8119PA.
 U S National Arboretum , Washington, D.C., US. Acc. no. 77501.

Europe 
 Brighton & Hove City Council, UK. NCCPG Elm Collection. Carden Park, Hollingdean (1 tree); Malthouse Car Park, Kemp Town (1 tree). 
 Grange Farm Arboretum, Sutton St James, Spalding, Lincolnshire, UK. Acc. no. 522
 Hortus Botanicus Nationalis, Salaspils, Latvia. Acc. nos. 18168, 18169, 18170.
 Linnaean Gardens of Uppsala, Sweden. Acc. no. 2009–0223. Wild collected in US.
 Royal Botanic Gardens Wakehurst Place, UK. Acc. no. 1973–21050.
 Thenford House arboretum, Northamptonshire, UK. No details available.
 University of Copenhagen Botanic Garden, Denmark. No details available.
 Wijdemeren city council, The Netherlands. One tree planted gardens Rading 1, Loosdrecht.

Australasia 
 Eastwoodhill Arboretum , Gisborne, New Zealand. 1 tree, no details available.

References

External links

 
 Dr. Duke's Databases: List of Chemicals in Ulmus rubra 
 Ohio DNR.gov: Slippery Elm
 Bioimages.vanderbilt.edu: Ulmus rubra photo gallery
  Sheet described as U. fulva
  Sheet described as U. fulva, RBGE specimen from Späth nursery 1902

rubra
Trees of the Eastern United States
Trees of Eastern Canada
Trees of the Great Lakes region (North America)
Trees of the Northeastern United States
Trees of the North-Central United States
Trees of the Southeastern United States
Trees of Ontario
Trees of Quebec
Flora of the Appalachian Mountains
Demulcents
Medicinal plants of North America
Ulmus articles with images
Elm species and varieties
Taxa named by Gotthilf Heinrich Ernst Muhlenberg